Culloden is a city in Monroe County, Georgia, United States. The population was 200 in the 2020 census. It is part of the Macon Metropolitan Statistical Area.

History
The first settlement at Culloden was made ca. 1739. The community was named after William Culloden, a local merchant. A post office called Culloden has been in operation since 1825. The Georgia General Assembly incorporated the place in 1887 as the "City of Culloden", with municipal corporate limits extending in a one-mile radius from the central town well.

Geography
Culloden is located in the southwestern part of Monroe County at  (32.863155, -84.093621).

The city is located along U.S. Route 341 and Georgia State Route 74. U.S. 341 runs from north to south just east of the city, leading north  to Barnesville and south  to Roberta. GA-74 runs from west to east to the north of the city, leading east  to Macon and west  to Thomaston.

The city sits on the Eastern Continental Divide, separating waters that flow southwest to the Gulf of Mexico from those that flow southeast to the Atlantic Ocean. Water on the west side of the city flows into tributaries of Auchumpkee Creek, which leads southwest to the Flint River, part of the Apalachicola River watershed, while water to the east flows to tributaries of Echeconnee Creek, which runs southeast to the Ocmulgee River, part of the Altamaha River watershed.

Demographics

As of the census of 2000, there were 223 people, 86 households, and 60 families residing in the city. The racial makeup of the city was 29.15% White and 70.85% African American. Hispanic or Latino of any race were 0.45% of the population.

There were 86 households, out of which 22.1% had children under the age of 18 living with them, 44.2% were married couples living together, 18.6% had a female householder with no husband present, and 30.2% were non-families. 27.9% of all households were made up of individuals, and 8.1% had someone living alone who was 65 years of age or older.  The average household size was 2.59 and the average family size was 3.22.

In the city, the population was spread out, with 20.6% under the age of 18, 4.9% from 18 to 24, 31.8% from 25 to 44, 27.8% from 45 to 64, and 14.8% who were 65 years of age or older.  The median age was 41 years. For every 100 females, there were 93.9 males.  For every 100 females age 18 and over, there were 96.7 males.

The median income for a household in the city was $28,393, and the median income for a family was $48,125. Males had a median income of $28,542 versus $20,469 for females. The per capita income for the city was $22,442.  About 12.7% of families and 15.6% of the population were below the poverty line, including 21.6% of those under the age of eighteen and 20.7% of those 65 or over.

Notable person
 Alfred Blalock, surgeon who developed the Blalock–Taussig shunt to relieve the cyanosis of Tetralogy of Fallot, leading to the modern era of cardiac surgery.

References

Cities in Georgia (U.S. state)
Cities in Monroe County, Georgia
Macon metropolitan area, Georgia